Thee Hounds of Foggy Notion is the title of the August 25, 2008 live CD/DVD release by San Francisco-based rock band Thee Oh Sees. Recorded during their Sucks Blood era in 2007, the performances include songs from previous albums, as well as others that were unreleased at the time. Some of those that had not appeared on any album were later reworked for 2008's The Master's Bedroom is Worth Spending a Night In, here performed in the more subdued psychedelic folk manner which characterized the band's sound during this period. This album was the final appearance of percussionist Patrick Mullins, who left the band after "Sucks Blood".

The live footage on the DVD was filmed over the course of four days in San Francisco. It features the band performing in mostly unconventional locales, such as on the shoulder of a highway and near the beach. The video footage was directed by Brian Lee Hughes.

Release
The first issue of the album was released by Tomlab as a CD/DVD set.. In 2009, HBSP-2X (now known as Captcha Records) issued the album on vinyl in yellow (limited to 300 copies), green, white, and black.

In 2011, Burger Records released a series of cassette tapes by Thee Oh Sees that contained two full-length albums on each cassette. Thee Hounds of Foggy Notion was paired with Dog Poison from 2009. Like the others, it was limited to 300 copies.

Track listing
Gilded Cunt
Island Raiders
Ship
Block of Ice
Curtains
Dumb Drums
We Are Free
Thee Hounds of Foggy Notion
Make Them Kiss
Golden Phones
If I Had a Reason
Highland Wife's Lament
Dreadful Heart
Ghost in the Trees
Iceberg
Second Date

Song appearances
 Tracks 11, 13, and 16 originally appeared on 3 & 4
 Tracks 1, 2, 6, and 7 originally appeared on The Cool Death Of Island Raiders
 Tracks 3, 10 and 15 originally appeared on Sucks Blood
 Track 9 originally appeared on Demos - EP
 Tracks 5, 8, and 12 made their first appearances on this album.
 Tracks 4 and 14 were modified and later appeared on Master's Bedroom Is Worth Spending A Night In

Credits
Petey Dammit - Guitar
Brigid Dawson - vocals
John Dwyer - vocals, guitar
Patrick Mullins - drums, percussion, saw

Personnel
Brian Lee Hughes - director

References

Oh Sees albums
2008 live albums